Yury Konoplev (born 2 February 1962) is a Belarusian professional football coach and former player. He spent the majority of his playing and coaching career in Vitebsk.

Honours
Lokomotiv-96 Vitebsk
Belarusian Cup winner: 1997–98

References

External links
 
 

1962 births
Living people
Soviet footballers
Belarusian footballers
Belarus international footballers
FC Vitebsk players
FC Dynamo Brest players
FC Naftan Novopolotsk players
Belarusian football managers
FC Vitebsk managers
FC Orsha managers
Association football defenders
Sportspeople from Vitebsk